The Tabernacle School District is a community public school district that serves students in pre-kindergarten through eighth grade from Tabernacle Township, in Burlington County, New Jersey, United States.

As of the 2020–21 school year, the district, comprised of two schools, had an enrollment of 658 students and 53.4 classroom teachers (on an FTE basis), for a student–teacher ratio of 12.3:1.

The district is classified by the New Jersey Department of Education as being in District Factor Group "GH", the third-highest of eight groupings. District Factor Groups organize districts statewide to allow comparison by common socioeconomic characteristics of the local districts. From lowest socioeconomic status to highest, the categories are A, B, CD, DE, FG, GH, I and J.

Public school students in Tabernacle Township in ninth through twelfth grades attend Seneca High School located in Tabernacle Township, which serves students in ninth through twelfth grade from Shamong, Southampton, Tabernacle and Woodland Townships. The school is part of the Lenape Regional High School District, which also serves students from Evesham Township, Medford Lakes, Medford Township, Mount Laurel Township, Shamong Township and Woodland Township. As of the 2020–21 school year, the high school had an enrollment of 1,073 students and 103.6 classroom teachers (on an FTE basis), for a student–teacher ratio of 10.4:1.

Schools
Schools in the district (with 2020–21 enrollment data from the National Center for Education Statistics) are:
Elementary school 
Tabernacle Elementary School with students in PreK-4
Shaun Banin, Principal
Middle school
Kenneth R. Olson Middle School with students in grades 5-8
Shaun Banin, Principal

Administration
Core members of the district's administration are:
Shaun Banin, Superintendent
Patricia Palmieri, Business Administrator

Board of education
The district's board of education, comprised of nine members, sets policy and oversees the fiscal and educational operation of the district through its administration. As a Type II school district, the board's trustees are elected directly by voters to serve three-year terms of office on a staggered basis, with three seats up for election each year held (since 2012) as part of the November general election. The board appoints a superintendent to oversee the district's day-to-day operations and a business administrator to supervise the business functions of the district.

References

External links

School Data for the Tabernacle School District, National Center for Education Statistics
Seneca High School
Lenape Regional High School District

Tabernacle Township, New Jersey
New Jersey District Factor Group GH
School districts in Burlington County, New Jersey